The Revolutionary Communist Party of France (French: Parti communiste révolutionnaire de France, abbreviated PCRF) is an anti-revisionist Marxist-Leninist communist party founded in 2016. It was the result of a merger of Intervention Communiste and the Union Révolutionaire Communistes de France (URCF).

History 
Initially in 1991, the Coordination Communiste pour la Continuité Révolutionnaire et la Renaissance Léniniste du PCF (CC) was established as an internal faction of the Parti Communiste Français (PCF) by the party's orthodox Marxists-Leninists members. In 1994, its press organ named Intervention Communiste (IC) was launched. At the faction's 4th national conference, a minority group led by Georges Gastaud split and established the Coordination des Militants Communistes du PCF pour sa Continuité Révolutionnaire et sa Renaissance Léniniste (CMC) staying in the PCF, which would eventually become the Pôle de renaissance communiste en France (PRCF).

The majority left the PCF and established the Coordination Communiste pour la Reconstruction d'un Parti Communiste Révolutionnaire (CC) led by Jean-Luc Sallé and Maurice Cukierman, which would eventually form the Union Révolutionaire Communistes de France  in 2004.

Maurice Cukierman died on July 24, 2020.  On August 29 the central committee unanimously elected Pierre Komorov (PK) as the new secretary-general, and Emmanuelle Kraemer as deputy secretary-general.

Ideology
The PCRF is an anti-revisionist communist party and upholds the legacy of the Soviet Union as a socialist country until the Perestroika period during Mikhail Gorbachev’s leadership. It considers the policy initiated by Nikita Khrushchev’s leadership initiated as degenerative and a step back from a socialist system to a capitalist one, a process which continued until Mikhail Gorbachev’s leadership, during which the capitalist regime was restored after the 1985-1991 counter-revolution. The PCRF recognizes the states of Cuba and the DPRK as the only examples of countries that build socialism at the moment, however, the party is not supportive of China,  which it views as an emerging imperialist power.

Election results 
The PCRF participated in the 2017 election for the National Assembly, fielding candidates in two constituencies.

In 2022 the party fields candidates in four constituencies:

See also 

 French Communist Party
 Communist Revolutionary Party (France)
 Pole of Communist Revival in France
 Workers' Communist Party of France

References

External links 

2016 establishments in France
Communist parties in France
Anti-revisionist organizations
Stalinist parties
Far-left politics in France
Eurosceptic parties in France
Political parties established in 2016